The 1973 Cal State Los Angeles Diablos football team represented California State University, Los Angeles as a member of the Pacific Coast Athletic Association (PCAA) during the 1973 NCAA Division I football season. The one game played against PCAA teams did not count in the conference standings. Led by Foster Andersen in his third and final season as head coach, Cal State Los Angeles compiled an overall record of 4–6–1. The team was outscored 320 to 281 for the season. The Diablos played home games at the Campus Stadium in Los Angeles.

Schedule

References

Cal State Los Angeles
Cal State Los Angeles Diablos football seasons
Cal State Los Angeles Diablos football